The Pentax K-3 II was a flagship APS-C DSLR camera announced by Ricoh on April 23, 2015.

It is differentiated from its predecessor by inclusion of a GPS module with AstroTracer functionality (automatic tracking of the passage of stars across the sky, i.e. compensation of the rotation of the Earth; allows sharper, more detailed (less noisy) astrophotographs from longer exposures) and by "Pixel Shift Resolution", a capture mode giving higher spatial resolution. The integrated GPS module can also record positions of the camera while not in use, which allows subsequently reconstructing the path taken by the photographer. The GPS module occupies the space formerly given to the onboard flash, which has been omitted.

Pixel Shift Resolution records four separate images in quick succession and combines them into a final image. The higher spatial resolution results from the fact that the sensor is shifted by one pixel between each pair of sequential exposures, such that all four colour filters in the Bayer pattern are applied once for each pixel (two green, one red, one blue). Therefore, the full colour spectrum is available for each pixel, giving more accurate (non-interpolated) colour and higher resolution. Pixel Shift images can be saved as JPEG or RAW, as can normal images. A Pixel Shift RAW file contains embedded in it the original four captures in RAW format. This capture mode is best used for static subjects, as approximately 1.3 seconds pass between the first and last exposure. This also dictates use of a tripod or other stabilisation for the camera.

Of further note is the image stabilisation system, which according to CIPA standard has been improved from 3.5 to 4.5 stops in effectiveness since the K-3. The manufacturer further states that autofocus has been improved.

References

External links

 Official product page, Ricoh Imaging Japan
 Official product page, Ricoh Imaging US

Cameras introduced in 2015
Live-preview digital cameras
K-3 II
Pentax K-mount cameras